Eva Demmerle (born 18 December 1967) is a German historian and writer. She was political assistant of Otto von Habsburg.

Life 
Eva Demmerle studied history, political science, economy and theology at the university of Bonn and in Siegen and Paris. 1995 she became the political assistant of Otto von Habsburg during his last period as member of the European parliament. From 1999 till his death 2011 she was head of the Habsburg office and press officer of the family. During this time she had access to the private archive of the Habsburg family and could review documents and pictures never published before. Due to her close relation with Otto von Habsburg she wrote biographies about him and his father Charles I., the last Emperor of Austria and King of Hungary. She lives and works as independent author in Feldafing in Germany.

Books 
 Kaiser Karl, Mythos & Wirklichkeit Amalthea Signum Verlag, 2016, 
 Das Haus Habsburg.  HF Ullmann Verlag, Potsdam 2011 und 2014, .
 Otto von Habsburg, Die Biografie. 5. Aufl., gemeinsam mit Stephan Baier, Amalthea, Wien 2007, .
 Der Habsburg-Faktor: Visionen für das neue Jahrtausend. Eva Demmerle im Gespräch mit Otto von Habsburg. REDLINE, 2007, .
 Kaiser Karl I. „Selig, die Frieden stiften ...“. Die Biographie. Amalthea, Wien 2004, .

References

External links 
 Official Website in German

1967 births
Living people
20th-century German historians
University of Bonn alumni
University of Siegen alumni
Place of birth missing (living people)
21st-century German historians